The Washington Statistical Society (WSS), based in Washington, D.C., is a chapter of the American Statistical Association (ASA).  The first American Statistical Association (ASA) meeting in Washington took place on December 31, 1896, for "members living in or near Washington" to hold meetings for scientific discussion. The WSS established its own Constitution in 1926, describing itself as "a branch of the American Statistical Association", and became a chapter of the ASA in 1935.

The WSS hosts events at which statisticians present their work; some of these statisticians have included Joseph Adna Hill, W. Edwards Deming, Morris H. Hansen, Margaret E. Martin, Jerome Cornfield, and Samuel W. Greenhouse.

The WSS also gives awards, such as the Curtis Jacobs Memorial Award, which was created in 1991 to honor the memory of Curtis Jacobs, a former Bureau of Labor Statistics statistician.

External links
 Washington Statistical Society, Past and Present, 1896 to 2012

References 

American Statistical Association
Professional associations based in the United States
Statistical organizations in the United States
1926 establishments in the United States